Skeleton in the Closet or Skeleton in the Cupboard may refer to:

 Skeleton in the closet, a colloquial phrase and idiom used to describe an undisclosed fact

Literature
 Skeletons in the Closet, 1982 novel by Elizabeth Linington
 A Skeleton in the Closet: A Novel, 1893 novel by E. D. E. N. Southworth
 "The Skeleton in the Closet", 1860s short story by Edward Everett Hale
The Skeleton in the Closet, 2003 children's book by Curtis Jobling
 The Skeleton in the Closet - A Halloween Tradition, 2013 Children's book by Chad Shea, illustrated by Danielle Beu of The Beu Sisters
 The Skeleton in the Cupboard, 1860 novel by Harriet Anne Scott
 The Skeleton in the Cupboard, 1988 novel by Anna Haycraft
Cakes and Ale: or, the Skeleton in the Cupboard, 1930 novel by W. Somerset Maugham

Film
 Skeleton in the Closet (1965 film) (also known as Secrets Behind the Wall), a Japanese film by Kōji Wakamatsu
 Skeletons in the Closet (2001 film), a film starring Treat Williams
 Skeletons in the Closet (2007 film), a Korean film nominated for the 2nd Asian Film Awards
 Skeletons in the Closet (2018 film), an American horror film
 Skeletons in the Closet (film), an American horror film starring Cuba Gooding Jr.

Music

Albums
 Skeletons from the Closet: The Best of Grateful Dead, 1974 album by the Grateful Dead
 R&B Skeletons in the Closet, 1986 album by George Clinton
 Skeletons in the Closet (Oingo Boingo album), 1989
 Skeletons in the Closet (Venom album), 1993 album by Venom
 Skeletons in the Closet, 1996 album by The Sharp
 Skeletons in the Closet (Gamma Ray album), 2003
 Skeletons in the Closet (Children of Bodom album), 2009

Songs
 "Skeleton in the Closet", by Louis Armstrong and his band
 "Skeleton in the Closet", by the Cornbugs on the 2001 album Cemetery Pinch
 "Skeletons in the Closet", by Alice Cooper on the 1981 album Special Forces
 "Skeletons in the Closet", by Infernäl Mäjesty on the 1987 album None Shall Defy
 "Skeletons in the Closet", by Nat Gonella & His Georgians
 "Skeleton In The Cupboard", 1953 composition by Leslie Statham
 "A Skeleton in the Closet", by Anthrax on the 1987 album Among the Living
 "Skeleton in Closet", by Eddie Murphy on the 1997 album Greatest Comedy Hits

Television
 "The Skeleton in the Cupboard" (Yes Minister)
 "Skeleton in the Closet" (Roseanne)
 "The Skeleton In The Cupboard" (2point4 Children)
 "Skeletons in the Closet", episode 2 of Beetlejuice
 "Lil' Miss /Skeletons In The Closet", episode 73 of Cold Case Files
 "Skeletons in the Closet", final episode of Legend
 "Skeletons in the Closet", episode 153 of G.I. Joe: A Real American Hero
 "Skeletons in the Closet", episode of Spenser: For Hire
 "Skeleton in the Cupboard", episode 11 of The Adventurer
 "Skeleton in the Cupboard", double episode of The Ghosts of Motley Hall
 "Skeletons in the Closet", episode 11 of The Legend of Korra
 "Jerangkung Dalam Almari" ("Skeletons in the Closet"), episode 6 of Gol & Gincu
"Skeletons in the Closet", season 2, episode 7 of Nightmare Next Door